is primarily a role-playing video game for the PlayStation. The anime series was produced by GONZO and was directed by Koichi Chigira. The network WOWOW aired the 24 episode series from April 3 to September 8, 2000. In 2001, Geneon Entertainment USA (then known as Pioneer) acquired the series and released them in eight volumes on DVD and VHS. In 2004, Geneon re-released the series under the Signature Series label. In 2007, Geneon USA went out of business and left the series (including the GK21 OVA's) out-of print.

Episode list

References

Gate Keepers